Sir Alexander Lillico (26 December 1872 – 14 December 1966) was a Tasmanian politician. He was an Independent member of the Tasmanian Legislative Council from 1924 to 1954, representing Mersey. He was created a Knight Bachelor in the New Year Honours List of 1962.

References

1872 births
1966 deaths
Place of birth missing
Place of death missing
Independent members of the Parliament of Tasmania
Members of the Tasmanian Legislative Council
Australian Knights Bachelor